Mamie or Maimie is a feminine given name and nickname (often of Mary) which may refer to:

Given name
 Mamie Claflin (1867-1929), American temperance and suffrage leader
 Mamie Clark (1917–1983), African-American psychologist
 Mamie Eisenhower (1896–1979), wife of President Dwight D. Eisenhower
 Mamie Johnson (1935–2017), first female pitcher in the Negro leagues
 Mamie Locke (born 1954), Democratic member of the Virginia Senate
 Maimie McCoy, English actress
 Mamie Smith (1883–1946), American vaudeville singer, dancer, pianist and actress
 Mamie Thurman (1901–1932), American murder victim
 Mamie Till (1921–2003) African-American educator and civil rights activist, mother of teenage lynching victim Emmett Till
 Mamie Van Doren, American actress and sex symbol born Joan Lucille Olander (born 1931)
 Mamie Jones, pseudonym of American singer Aileen Stanley (1897–1982)

Nickname
 Mamie Cadden (1891–1959), Irish midwife, backstreet abortionist and convicted murderer
 Mary Dickens (1838–1896), daughter of Charles Dickens
 Marion Graves Anthon Fish (1853–1915), American socialite
 Mamie Gummer (born 1983), American actress
 Mamie Lincoln Isham (1869–1938), granddaughter of Abraham Lincoln
 Lady Mary Lygon (1910–1982), British aristocrat and Russian princess by marriage known as Maimie

Fictional characters
 Mamie Dubcek, on the American sitcom 3rd Rock from the Sun
 Maimie Flanagan, in the play The Field by John B. Keane
 Mamie Johnson, on the American soap opera The Young and the Restless
 Maimie Mannering, a love interest of Peter Pan, considered the literary predecessor of Wendy Darling
 the title character of The Revolt of Mamie Stover, a 1951 novel by William Bradford Huie
 Miss Mamie Baldwin, on the 1970s television series The Waltons

See also
 USS Massachusetts, a World War II battleship nicknamed "Big Mamie"
 Mami (disambiguation)
 Mammy (disambiguation)

Hypocorisms
Lists of people by nickname
ja:マミー